Local elections were held in  Bacolod on May 9, 2016, as part of the Philippine general election. The elective local posts in the city: the mayor, vice mayor, the congressman, and twelve councilors, were filled in.

Background
Former Mayor, now Bacolod Representative, Evelio Leonardia served out his term limitation for the mayoralty post as Bacolod's lone district representative to Congress. He chose to contest his former post against incumbent Mayor Monico Puentevella.

Mayoral and vice mayoral election
The candidates for mayor and vice mayor with the highest number of votes wins the seat; they are voted separately, therefore, they may be of different parties when elected.

Results

District Representative election

City Council election
Election is via plurality-at-large voting: A voter votes for up to twelve candidates, then the ten candidates with the highest number of votes are elected.

Grupo Progreso

Partido MKK

Results

|-bgcolor=black
|colspan=5|

References

2016 Philippine local elections
Politics of Bacolod